Raymond Y. K. Kan (born 1932) was a Hong Kong architect and politician. He was a member of the Urban Council of Hong Kong for the Hong Kong Civic Association.

Biography
Kan was born in Hong Kong with the family root of Hainan, Guangdong in 1932. He was educated in Hong Kong and Australia, graduated from the Pui Ching Middle School and the University of Melbourne with a degree in Architecture. He worked at the Public Works Department after he returned to Hong Kong for three years, before he set up his own architecture firm .

In 1969, he was nominated by the Hong Kong Civic Association to run in the Urban Council election. He served in the committees of the Urban Council and government-appointed positions. He was also vice-chairman of the Hong Kong Civic Association, president of the Scout Association of Hong Kong in South Kowloon Region and vice-president for the Kowloon Region, secretary and treasurer of the Leo Distrinct 303 of the Lions Clubs International and became president of the Victoria Lion Club from 1969 to 1970. In December 1971, he was appointed to the Commission of Inquiry into the Fire on the Jumbo Floating Restaurant, in which a fire took place on board the vessel 'Jumbo' at Aberdeen Harbour on 30 October 1971 where 34 people died and 42 were injured in the
incident.

In March 1972, Kan was elected chairman of the Tung Wah Group of Hospitals, the most powerful charitable organisation in the colony. Before that, he had been director and vice-chairman of the institution.

On the 13 May protest organised by the Hong Kong Federation of Students (HKFS) which was not approved by the police, Kan disagreed with the Attorney General Denys Roberts' decision not to charge the student protesters was too tolerant.

References

1932 births
Members of the Urban Council of Hong Kong
Hong Kong architects
Tung Wah Group of Hospitals
University of Melbourne alumni
Living people